Baron Bingley is a title that has been created three times, twice in the Peerage of Great Britain and once in the Peerage of the United Kingdom.

History 
The first creation came in 1713 in the Peerage of Great Britain, when the former Chancellor of the Exchequer, Robert Benson, was made Baron Bingley, of Bingley in the County of York. He had no sons and the title became extinct on his death in 1731.

However, the title was revived in 1762 for his son-in-law, George Fox-Lane, who was also created Baron Bingley, of Bingley in the County of York, with remainder only to his heirs male with his wife, Harriet (daughter of the first Baron of the 1713 creation). Born George Fox, he was the son of Henry Fox and Frances, daughter of George Lane, 1st Viscount Lanesborough (see Viscount Lanesborough), and assumed in 1751 by Act of Parliament the additional surname of Lane. Before his elevation to the peerage he had represented Hedon and York in the House of Commons. His son and heir, Robert Fox-Lane, Member of Parliament for York, predeceased him in 1768 and the barony consequently became extinct on Lord Bingley's death in 1773.

The most recent creation came in the Peerage of the United Kingdom in 1933, when the Conservative politician George Lane-Fox, was created Baron Bingley, of Bramham in the County of York. He was the great-great-grandson of James Fox-Lane, a nephew of the first Baron of the second creation, and was a former Member of Parliament for Barkston Ash. Lord Bingley had four daughters but no sons and on his death in 1947, this title also became extinct.

Barons Bingley; First creation (1713)
Robert Benson, 1st Baron Bingley (c. 1676–1731)

Barons Bingley; Second creation (1763)
George Fox-Lane, 1st Baron Bingley (c. 1697–1773)
Robert Fox-Lane (1732–1768)

Barons Bingley; Third creation (1933)
George Richard Lane-Fox, 1st Baron Bingley (1870–1947)

References

Baronies in the Peerage of Great Britain
Extinct baronies in the Peerage of Great Britain
Extinct baronies in the Peerage of the United Kingdom
1713 establishments in Great Britain
Noble titles created in 1713
Noble titles created in 1763
Noble titles created in 1933
Noble titles created for UK MPs
Peerages created with special remainders